Bow Island Airport  is located  northeast of Bow Island, Alberta, Canada.

References

External links
Page about this aerodrome on COPA's Places to Fly airport directory

Registered aerodromes in Alberta